A koala is a marsupial native to Australia.

Koala or KOALA may also refer to:

Arts and entertainment
 The Koala, a satirical comedy college paper
 "Koala" (song), a song by Oliver Heldens
 El Koala or Jesús Manuel Rodríguez (born 1970), Spanish musician
 Kid Koala, stage name of Canadian DJ, turntablist, musician and author Eric San (born 1974)
 Kids Own Australian Literature Awards
 Koala, character in the Hunter × Hunter manga series

Aircraft
 AgustaWestland AW119 Koala, a helicopter
 Fisher FP-202 Koala, Canadian kit aircraft
 Fisher Super Koala, Canadian kit aircraft
 Pottier P.220S Koala, a French two-seat light homebuilt aircraft

Other uses
 Sam (koala), also known as Sam the Koala, was a female koala from the forests of Mirboo North, Victoria, Australia. It was rescued by a firefighter during the aftermath of the Black Saturday bushfires.
 Koala (transient) and The Koala (transient), large astronomical explosion
 Kh-90, a Soviet/Russian cruise missile, NATO designation AS-X-19 Koala
 HMAS Koala, a World War II Royal Australian Navy boom defence vessel
 Koala, an Australian racing car - see Bowin Cars
 Koala Island, Antarctica
 A former kingdom in Liptako, West Africa - see List of rulers of Liptako
 Marthe Koala (born 1994), Burkinabe hurdler and heptathlete

See also
 Kohala (disambiguation)
 Coala
 Kuala